Guard Glacier is a broad tributary glacier that drains east along the southern margin of Parmelee Massif to join Murrish Glacier, on the east side of Palmer Land, Antarctica. It was mapped by the United States Geological Survey in 1974, and was named by the Advisory Committee on Antarctic Names for Charles L. Guard, a United States Antarctic Research Program biologist who (with David E. Murrish) made investigations of peripheral vascular control mechanisms in birds in the Antarctic Peninsula region for three seasons, 1972–75.

References

Glaciers of Palmer Land